The Family Link (Traditional Chinese: 師奶兵團) is a TVB modern drama series broadcast in May 2007.

Synopsis
Mung Ka-Ka (Sheren Tang), Cho Mei-Ngoh (Kiki Sheung), and Hilary Ding Mui-Hong (Cecilia Yip) are good friends and they are experts on how to raise a family. They teach Ko Wing-Kuen (David Chiang) how to raise his daughter and show him that it takes more than words to care for a child.

Along the way, they find out that their husbands might be secretly doing things behind their backs: 
 Ka-Ka suspects her husband Joe Fong Yin-Jo (Michael Tse) is secretly pretending to be a woman, while in reality he is trying to pursue his goal of becoming a cross-dressing pop star.
 Mei-Ngoh's husband Ma Dai-Hap (Wilson Tsui) might be cheating on her with another woman.
 Mui-Hong thinks her husband Bill Cheuk Kam-Biu (Derek Kwok) might be having an affair in which causes her to receive sexual diseases.
 Shu Siu-Man (Leila Tong) just came back from America and suspects all three of them to have caused the death of her best friend Yoyo who is also Gam Shing-Tsun's (Kenneth Ma) wife.

Cast

Viewership ratings

Awards and nominations
40th TVB Anniversary Awards (2007)
 "Best Drama"
 "Best Actor in a Leading Role" (Michael Tse - Joe Fong Yin-Jo)
 "Best Actress in a Leading Role" (Sheren Tang - Mung Ka-Ka)
 "Best Actress in a Leading Role" (Kiki Sheung - Cho Mei-Ngoh)
 "Best Actor in a Supporting Role" (Kenneth Ma - Gam Sing-Tsun)
 "Best Actor in a Supporting Role" (Derek Kok - Bill Cheuk Kam-Biu)
 "Best Actor in a Supporting Role" (Wilson Tsui - Ma Dai-Hap)
 "Best Actress in a Supporting Role" (Leila Tong - Shu Siu-Man)
 "My Favourite Male Character" (Michael Tse - Joe Fong Yin-Jo)
 "My Favourite Male Character" (David Chiang - Ko Wing-Kuen)
 "My Favourite Female Character" (Sheren Tang - Mung Ka-Ka)
 "My Favourite Female Character" (Kiki Sheung - Cho Mei-Ngoh)
 "My Favourite Female Character" (Leila Tong - Shu Siu-Man)

References

External links
TVB.com The Family Link - Official Website 
K for TVB.net The Family Link - Episodic Synopsis and  Screen Captures 

TVB dramas
2007 Hong Kong television series debuts
2007 Hong Kong television series endings